Jozef Štafura (born 11 September 1948 in Pavlovce nad Uhom, Czechoslovakia) is a former Slovak football midfielder who played for Strážske and mostly for VSS Košice (1969–80). He played overall 251 games and scored 26 goals during his ten seasons at the Czechoslovak First League. He was a part of the legendary VSS midfield from the 1970s, including trio Štafura – Daňko – Pollák.

On 2 May 1973, Štafura made his only appearance for the Czechoslovakia national football team in a 1–1 away draw against Denmark at the 1974 FIFA World Cup qualification.

After his playing career he was an assistant coach of 1. FC Košice and the Slovakia national under-21 football team (1993–97) alongside Milan Lešický.

External links

1948 births
Living people
Slovak footballers
Czechoslovak footballers
Czechoslovakia international footballers
FC VSS Košice players
Slovak football managers
Association football midfielders